Hans Munch was a Danish-Norwegian theologian and priest.  He served as a bishop of the Diocese of Christianssand from 1694 until 1699 and of the Diocese of Christiania from 1699 until his death in 1712.

Personal life
Hans Nielsen Munch was born on 5 June 1654 in the village of Torkildstrup on the island of Falster in southeastern Denmark.  His parents were Niels Munch and Karen Sadolin.  He married Anna Aagaard, the cousin to the King's mistress, Sophie Amalie Moth.

Education and career
He was educated in Helsingør, graduating in 1672.  He received a magister's degree in 1677.  In 1680, he was hired as a parish priest in Kalundborg.  In 1686, he was called to be the dean in Christiania.  In 1694, he was appointed to be the Bishop of the Diocese of Christianssand.  He accepted the position, but he also received a royal promise that when the bishop's seat in Christiania became vacant, he would get to transfer there.  In 1699, that seat became vacant upon the death of Hans Rosing, and Munch was transferred there to serve as the Bishop of the Diocese of Christiania.  He was present for the coronation of the new King Frederik IV in 1700.  The same year, he received his doctor of theology degree.  During his time as a bishop, he maintained his duties, but did not excel. In 1704, the King came to Christiania and he gave a sermon for the King, but it was characterized as a sermon of a country citizen, but not of a bishop.  The only time he showed real zeal as a bishop was one time when he expelled a Quaker priest from London who had been traveling through the diocese preaching.  He served there until his death on 24 June 1712.

References

1654 births
1712 deaths
Bishops of Agder og Telemark
Bishops of Oslo
18th-century Lutheran bishops
17th-century Lutheran bishops